The Church of the Teutonic Order, also known as the Church of Saint Elisabeth of Hungary, is the mother church of the Teutonic Order, a German-based Roman Catholic religious order formed at the end of the 12th century. Located in Vienna, Austria, near the Stephansdom, it is the current seat of the Grand Master of the Order.

Church 
This Gothic church was built in the 14th century (1326–1375) and consecrated to St. Elisabeth of Hungary. Some of the stucco work was performed by the Italian artists Simone Allio in 1697 and Girolamo Alfieri in 1700. The church was remodelled in Baroque style in 1720 (probably) by the architect Anton Erhard Martinelli, while Count Guido von Starhemberg was the commander of the Order. Alfieri worked again in this church in the period 1720–1725, as well as the sculptor Giovanni Antonio Canevale. However, the church has retained some of its Gothic origins, such as pointed arches in the windows.

The walls are decorated with rows of numerous armorial bearings of the Order of Teutonic Knights and several commemorative stones, such as the tombstone of Count Siegfried Sarau with relief work by Giovanni Stanetti and of bailiff Jobst von Wetzhausen (1524) by Loy Hering.

Of particular interest is the Flemish winged triptych, a polychromed altarpiece from 1520. The woodcarver and the painter are unknown. The polychromy was made and signed by Jan van Wavere, a polychromer from Mechelen. It depicts in vivid woodcarvings scenes from the Passion of Christ.

Treasury of the Teutonic Order 
The church is incorporated in the Deutschordenshaus, the seat of the Order. Next to the cobbled inner courtyard is the Schatzkammer (the Treasure Room), a real ecclesiastical treasure trove that has been turned into a museum, consisting of five rooms on the second floor. The different collections have been built by successive Grand Masters during eight centuries. They constitute one of the oldest treasure collections in Vienna, covering the Gothic, Renaissance, and Baroque periods. The real start of the Schatzkammer can be dated to 1525 when the Grand Master Albert of Prussia converted to Lutheranism and declared the collections his private property. The museum was reopened on 22 April 2006 after an extensive renovation.

The first room displays Gothic coins, medals, seals, crosses, and a 13th-century coronation ring.

The second room shows chalices with silvery filigree, but also some more extravagant features. There is a salt-cellar tree, made from red coral, hung with sharks' teeth. In medieval times these were thought to be fossilized adders' tongues, able to detect poisoned food. Also remarkable are a number of vessels made of coconut shells, such one from Goa with silver mountings and another one in chinoiserie style. Also notable is a silver chain (ca. 1500) for the sword carried by the members of the Order. It carries a hanger depicting the Madonna and Child and the insignia of the Order. A precious table clock is adorned with garnets and turquoise and surrounded with a garland of gilded leaves.

The other rooms contain a collection of oriental arms such as a Sumatran kris with a wavy blade and a rhino horn handle, carved in the shape of Buddha with precious stones. Another valuable piece of the collection is the charter by Pope Gregory IX from 1235, declaring Elisabeth of Thuringia a saint. Finally, there are several Gothic paintings and a Carinthian woodcarving of Saint George and the Dragon.

The treasury is open on Tuesdays, Thursdays and Saturdays 10am-12noon, Wednesdays and Fridays 3-5pm.

See also

Notes

References 

Demel, Bernhard and Krones, Wolfgang. Das Deutsch-Ordens-Haus zu Wien: Von den Anfängen des Ordens im Jahre 1190 bis heute. Wien 1994.

External links

Homepage of the Teutonic Order (in German)
Treasury and museum of the Teutonic Order (in German)

13th-century Roman Catholic church buildings in Austria
Buildings and structures in Innere Stadt
Buildings and structures of the Teutonic Order
Churches completed in 1375
Museums in Vienna
Religious museums in Austria
Teutonic Order